Ali Shallal al-Qaisi is an Iraqi who was captured in United States custody during CIA interrogation at Abu Ghraib Prison in 2003. His name became known in 2004 when the prisoner torture and abuse at Abu Ghraib made news.

Al-Qaisi said: "I'm spending sleepless nights thinking about the agony I went through... I even have recurring nightmares that I'm in my cell at Abu Ghraib, cell 49 as they called it, being tortured at the hands of the people of a great nation that carries the torch of freedom and human rights."

According to Al-Qaisi, the US military seized his football pitch for the purpose of dumping corpses and waste. He was arrested after attempting to contact foreign reporters about the incident.

Al-Qaisi has had to undergo six surgeries from the torture he was subject to. His left hand is mutilated due to electrocution.

See also
 Abu Ghraib torture and prisoner abuse

References

External links
 
 
 
 

1962 births
Living people
Abu Ghraib torture and prisoner abuse
Iraqi torture victims
People from Baghdad
Photography in Iraq
Victims of human rights abuses